Olav Berkaak (6 November 1915 – 5 January 1980) was a Norwegian novelist and teacher at a folk high school.

Berkaak was born in Rennebu. Among his books are the novels Snø og eld from 1953, Det ædle malm from 1956, and November from 1958. The novel Riaren from 1973 treats a rural society in the 19th century. He was awarded the Melsom Prize in 1957.

References

1915 births
1980 deaths
People from Rennebu
Norwegian writers
Norwegian schoolteachers